= Decision at Gettysburg =

1990 video game

- Developer(s): Tiglon Software
- Publisher(s): Tiglon Software
- Platform(s): IBM PC
- Release: 1990

Decision at Gettysburg is a 1990 video game published by Tiglon Software.

== Gameplay ==
Decision at Gettysburg is a game in which a strategic simulation involves the Battle of Gettysburg of the American Civil War.

== Reception ==
M. Evan Brooks reviewed the game for Computer Gaming World, and stated that "Decision At Gettysburg is the first product from a new company. It attempted to do much and has actually achieved some of its objectives. The fact remains that it is currently cumbersome and awkward. However, its designers have shown a willingness to correct many of the deficiencies and, when this is done, DAG may well be one of the best operational computer wargames released."
